Zellendorf station is a railway station in the municipality of Zellendorf, located in the Teltow-Fläming district in Brandenburg, Germany.

History
The stop (line-kilometre 75.2), which was closed in 1995, was put back into operation in a different location (line-kilometre 75.8) in December 2013.

References

Railway stations in Brandenburg
Buildings and structures in Teltow-Fläming